Clinidium insigne is a species of ground beetle in the subfamily Rhysodinae. It was described by Antoine Henri Grouvelle in 1903. It is known from Ecuador (several locations, including its type locality), provisionally from Cali, Colombia, and Yacambú National Park in Venezuela.

Clinidium insigne measures  in length.

References

Clinidium
Beetles of South America
Invertebrates of Ecuador
Invertebrates of Venezuela
Beetles described in 1903